The following is a list of deaths in April 2009.

Entries for each day are listed alphabetically by surname. A typical entry lists information in the following sequence:
 Name, age, country of citizenship at birth, subsequent country of citizenship (if applicable), reason for notability, cause of death (if known), and reference.

April 2009

1
Arne Andersson, 91, Swedish middle distance runner and former world record holder (1500m).
Umberto Betti, 87, Italian Roman Catholic prelate, Cardinal of Santi Vito, Modesto e Crescenzio since 2007.
John Blankenchip, 89, American educator, theater director and designer, after short illness.
Paul Dean, Baron Dean of Harptree, 84, British politician, Deputy Speaker of the House of Commons (1982–1992).
Margreta Elkins, 78, Australian mezzo-soprano, cancer.
Duane Jarvis, 51, American guitarist and singer-songwriter, colon cancer.
Marsel Markulin, 72, Croatian Olympic gymnast.
Marcos Moshinsky, 88, Ukrainian-born Mexican physicist.
Daniel Joseph O'Hern, 78, American jurist, member of the New Jersey Supreme Court (1981–2000), melanoma.
Elaine Cancilla Orbach, 69, American actress, wife of Jerry Orbach, pneumonia.
Lou Perryman, 67, American actor (Poltergeist, The Blues Brothers, Boys Don't Cry), stabbed.
Miguel Ángel Suárez, 69, Puerto Rican actor, esophageal cancer.
Ian Tomlinson, 47, British pedestrian allegedly assaulted by police at 2009 G-20 London summit protests, abdominal haemorrhage.

2
Ghulam Mohammed Baloch, 50, Pakistani politician.
Exotic Dancer, 9, French-bred British racehorse, heart attack after race.
Ev Faunce, 82, American football player and coach.
Guttorm Hansen, 88, Norwegian politician, President of Parliament (1973–1981).
Taj Muhammad Jamali, 70, Pakistani politician, Chief Minister of Balochistan (1990–1993).
Albert Sanschagrin, 97, Canadian Bishop of Saint-Hyacinthe (1967–1979).
Bud Shank, 82, American alto saxophonist, pulmonary failure.
Frank Springer, 79, American comic book artist, prostate cancer.
Andrew Steiner, 100, Czechoslovak-American architect and Jewish resistance member during the Holocaust.

3
Ken Anderson, 33, American football player (Chicago Bears), heart attack.
James G. Boswell II, 86, American businessman, natural causes.
Thomas Braden, 92, American journalist and author (Eight Is Enough), cardiac arrest.
Eva Evdokimova, 60, Swiss-born American ballerina, complications of cancer.
Charlie Kennedy, 81, American alto saxophonist, pulmonary disease.
John King, 55, American ukulele player, heart attack.
Victor Millan, 89, American actor and theatre professor.
Alexei Parshchikov, 54, Russian poet.
Crodowaldo Pavan, 89, Brazilian biologist and geneticist, multiple organ dysfunction syndrome and cancer.
Tom Smith, 88, British make-up artist.
Jerome R. Waldie, 84, American politician, Representative from California (1966–1975).

4
Trevor Bull, 64, British Olympic cyclist.
Jobie Dajka, 27, Australian track cyclist, 2002 Keirin world champion.
Adriano Directo Emperado, 82, American martial artist (kajukenbo).
Maxine Cooper Gomberg, 84, American actress (Kiss Me Deadly), natural causes
Netherwood Hughes, 108, British fourth-to-last veteran of World War I.
Jody McCrea, 74, American actor, son of Joel McCrea and Frances Dee, cardiac arrest.
Gonzalo Olave, 25, Chilean actor, motorcycle accident.
I. Herbert Scheinberg, 89, American doctor, pneumonia.
Nelly Sindayen, 59, Filipino journalist, Manila correspondent for Time magazine, complications from diabetic stroke.
Cecil Skotnes, 82, South African artist, pneumonia.
Armand Tanny, 90, American bodybuilder, natural causes.
Marvin Webster, 56, American basketball player (Seattle SuperSonics), natural causes.

5
Wouter Barendrecht, 43, Dutch film producer, heart failure.
Guy Brown, 72, Canadian politician, mayor of Springhill, Nova Scotia (2004–2008), after long illness.
Thomas R. Byrne, 86, American politician, Mayor of Saint Paul, Minnesota (1966–1970), cancer.
Tony D, 42, American hip hop DJ and musician, car accident.
Sir Michael Giddings, 88, British air marshal.
I. J. Good, 92, British mathematician, statistician and cryptographer, natural causes.
Sir Neil MacCormick, 67, British jurist and Scottish nationalist politician, cancer.
Alfredo Marcano, 62, Venezuelan former WBA world super featherweight (junior lightweight) champion boxer.
Rocco Morabito, 88, American Pulitzer Prize-winning photographer.
Nancy Overton, 83, American pop singer (The Chordettes), esophageal cancer.
Constantine Papadakis, 63, Greek-born American president of Drexel University, complications from lung cancer.
William Tobin, 83, American journalist, esophageal cancer.
George Tribe, 88, Australian cricketer.
Ole Gabriel Ueland, 78, Norwegian politician.
David Wheatley, 59, British film and television director, after long illness.

6
A-Sun, 34, Taiwanese singer, breast cancer.
Steve Cannon, 81, American radio personality (WCCO), cancer.
J. M. S. Careless, 90, Canadian historian.
Luigi Casola, 87, Italian cyclist.
Dwight Crandell, 86, American volcanologist, heart attack.
Dorothy Cullman, 91, American philanthropist, complications of brain injury.
Russell E. Dunham, 89, American war veteran, Medal of Honor recipient, heart failure.
Jacques Hustin, 69, Belgian singer-songwriter.
Shawn Mackay, 26, Australian rugby union player (Brumbies), cardiac arrest following car accident.
Ivy Matsepe-Casaburri, 71, South African Minister of Communications (since 1999) and acting President (2008), natural causes.
Andrzej Stelmachowski, 84, Polish academic and politician.
Mari Trini, 61, Spanish pop singer and actress.
Svetlana Ulmasova, 56, Uzbekistani athlete.
Damouré Zika, 85, Nigerien film actor and traditional healer, after long illness.

7
Dave Arneson, 61, American game designer, co-creator of Dungeons & Dragons, cancer.
Samuel Beer, 97, American academic, expert on British government.
Raja Chelliah, 86, Indian economist, founder of Madras School of Economics, after short illness.
Stanley Jaki, 84, Hungarian-born American theologian, heart attack.
Philip Moore, Baron Moore of Wolvercote, 88, British private secretary to Queen Elizabeth II (1977–1986).
Paddy O'Hanlon, 65, Irish politician and barrister, after short illness.
Leo Prieto, 88, Filipino sports executive, PBA Commissioner (1975–1982), stroke.
Gordon Slynn, Baron Slynn of Hadley, 79, British jurist, cancer.
Michael Stern, 98, American journalist and philanthropist, co-founder of Intrepid Sea-Air-Space Museum, pancreatic cancer.
Hyacinth Tungutalum, 62, Australian politician, heart attack.
Jack Wrangler, 62, American pornographic film actor, writer, and producer, emphysema.

8
Lennie Bennett, 70, British comedian and game show host (Lucky Ladders), after short illness.
Jane Bryan, 90, American actress, after long illness.
Willard Fuller, 93, American faith healer.
Henri Meschonnic, 76, French poet, linguist, translator and theoretician.
Dan Miller, 67, American television journalist (WSMV, KCBS), heart attack.
Piotr Morawski, 32, Polish mountain climber, mountaineering accident.
Marat Nyýazow, 75, Turkmen-born Soviet sport shooter, Olympic silver medalist (1960).
Jean Overton Fuller, 94, British writer and painter.
Tam Paton, 70, Scottish music manager and spokesperson for the Bay City Rollers, suspected heart attack.
Tori Stafford, 8, Canadian murder victim, blunt trauma.
David Winans, 74, American gospel singer, heart attack.

9
Nick Adenhart, 22, American baseball pitcher (Los Angeles Angels of Anaheim), car accident.
Edgar Buchwalder, 92, Swiss Olympic cyclist and silver medalist.
Randy Cain, 63, American singer (The Delfonics).
Mike Casey, 60, American college basketball player (Kentucky Wildcats) (1967–1971), heart disease.
Colin Jordan, 85, British politician and Neo-Nazi activist.
Ernest Manirumva, Burundian anti-corruption activist (OLUCOME), stabbed.
Shakti Samanta, 83, Indian film director and producer, cardiac arrest.
Dale Swann, 61, American character actor, complications of stroke.

10
Richard Arnell, 91, English composer.
John Spoor Broome, 91, American rancher and philanthropist.
Richard Cartwright, 95, British Anglican prelate, Bishop of Plymouth (1972–1982).
Blake Chanslor, 88, American businessman, founder of Blake's Lotaburger.
Deborah Digges, 59, American poet, apparent suicide by jumping.
Frank Morris, 85, Canadian football player and executive, after long illness.
Naum Olev, 70, Russian lyricist.
Yevgeny Vesnik, 86, Russian actor, stroke.

11
Aida Abdullayeva, 86, Azerbaijani harpist.
James William Brodie, 88, New Zealand geologist, oceanographer and geophysicist.
Mickey Cafagna, 65, American politician, mayor of Poway, California, complications from kidney cancer.
Simon Channing-Williams, 63, British film producer, cancer.
Albert Chernenko, 74, Russian philosopher, son of Konstantin Chernenko.
Rob Dickson, 45, Australian football player, winner of Australian Survivor, car accident.
Gerda Gilboe, 94, Danish actress.
Judith Krug, 69, American librarian, founder of Banned Books Week, stomach cancer.
René Monory, 85, French politician, President of the Senate (1992–1998).
Tita Muñoz, 82, Filipino actress, after long illness.
Jimmy Neighbour, 58, British footballer (Norwich City, Tottenham Hotspur), heart attack.
Vishnu Prabhakar, 97, Indian writer, after long illness.
Johnny Roadhouse, 88, British saxophonist.
Al Rosenbaum, 82, American sculptor, co-founder of the Virginia Holocaust Museum.
Corín Tellado, 81, Spanish novelist, heart failure.
Zeke Zarchy, 93, American swing music jazz trumpeter.

12
Sitara Achakzai, 52, Afghan women's rights activist and politician, shot.
Javier de Bengoechea, 89, Spanish poet.
Danny Cameron, 85, Canadian politician, Leader of the Opposition in the Legislative Assembly of New Brunswick (1991–1995).
Marilyn Chambers, 56, American pornographic film actress (Behind the Green Door), erotic dancer, and politician, heart disease.
Kent Douglas, 73, Canadian ice hockey player (Toronto Maple Leafs), cancer
Gene Handley, 94, American baseball player.
Mike Keen, 69, British footballer, after short illness.
Hans Kleppen, 102, Norwegian ski jumper.
Sir Kirby Laing, 92, British civil engineer.
Sir John Maddox, 83, British science writer, editor (Nature, 1966–1973, 1980–1995).
Stephen Minarik, 49, American politician, chairman of the New York Republican State Committee (2004–2006), heart attack.
Ephraim Obot, 72, Nigerian Roman Catholic prelate, Bishop of Idah since 1977.
Franklin Rosemont, 65, American surrealist poet, labor historian and co-founder of the Chicago Surrealist Group.
Eve Kosofsky Sedgwick, 58, American writer and critical theorist, pioneer of queer studies, breast cancer.
Ishaq Shahryar, 73, Afghan-born American scientist and ambassador.
Derek Weiler, 40, Canadian editor and writer.

13
John Armitage, 88, Australian politician, MP (1961–1963, 1969–1983).
Björn Borg, 89, Swedish Olympic swimmer.
Stefan Brecht, 84, German poet, son of Bertolt Brecht and Helene Weigel, after long illness.
Frank Costigan, 78, Australian lawyer and royal commissioner, head of the Costigan Commission.
Tony Eckstein, 85, American politician and veterinarian.
Mark Fidrych, 54, American baseball pitcher (Detroit Tigers), suffocation.
Jack D. Hunter, 87, American author, cancer.
Harry Kalas, 73, American sportscaster, heart attack.
Ossie Lambert, 82, Australian cricketer.
Ángel Miguel, 79, Spanish professional golfer.
Bruce Snyder, 69, American football coach, melanoma.
Alfred Swift, 77, South African Olympic cyclist.
Teo Usuelli, 78, Italian film score composer.
Kevin Walton, 90, British winner of the Albert Medal.
Zhu Min, 83, Chinese professor and daughter of Zhu De.

14
Richard Baker, 62, American surf apparel executive (Ocean Pacific), cancer.
Maurice Druon, 90, French novelist, Dean of the Académie française (French Academy), and French Resistance fighter.
Fuyuko Kamisaka, 78, Japanese historian, author and critic, cancer.
Les Keiter, 89, American sportscaster, natural causes.
Max Lake, 84, Australian winemaker, fall.
Marcus Loane, 97, Australian Anglican Primate (1978–1982), Archbishop of Sydney (1966–1982), after short illness.
Peter Rogers, 95, British film producer (Carry On series).
Royce Ryton, 84, British playwright.

15
Ed Blake, 83, American baseball player, after long illness.
Sir Clement Freud, 84, German-born British writer, broadcaster and politician, MP (1973–1987).
Merle Harmon, 82, American sportscaster, pneumonia.
Wisdom Siziba, 28, Zimbabwean cricketer, heart failure.
László Tisza, 101, Hungarian-born American physicist.

16
Patty Costello, 61, American ten-pin bowler, pancreatic cancer.
Michael Martin Dwyer, 24, Irish security guard, shot.
Sal Guarriello, 90, American politician, after short illness.
Tengiz Gudava, 55, Georgian-born Soviet dissident and journalist (RFE/RL).
Timothy Holst, 61, American circus ringmaster, after short illness.
James D. Houston, 75, American author, cancer.
Jim Lange, 82, American editorial cartoonist (The Oklahoman), after long illness.
Svein Longva, 65, Norwegian economist, State Conciliator (2005–2009).
Michel Mondésert, 92, French Roman Catholic prelate, Auxiliary Bishop of Grenoble.
Abdel Halim Muhammad, 99, Sudanese doctor, President of the CAF (1968–1972), member of Committee of Sovereignty of The Sudan (1964–1965).
Viktor Paskov, 59, Bulgarian writer, lung cancer.
Eduardo Rózsa-Flores, 49, Hungarian journalist, writer, actor and soldier, shot.
*Saensak Muangsurin, 58, Thai former WBC light welterweight champion boxer (fastest ever pro champion), intestinal complications.

17
Sir Martin Garrod, 73, British army general, Commandant General Royal Marines (1987–1990).
Väinö Hakkarainen, 76, Finnish Olympic wrestler.
Midge Miller, 86, American politician, member of the Wisconsin State Assembly (1971–1985), cancer.
Honoré Desmond Sharrer, 88, American artist.

18
Tissa Abeysekara, 69, Sri Lankan film director, writer and actor, brain haemorrhage.
Yvon Bourges, 87, French politician and colonial administrator, Governor-General of French Equatorial Africa.
Toi Aukuso Cain, 50, Samoan politician and murderer, liver cancer.
Peter Dennis, 75, British actor.
Edward George, Baron George, 70, British public official, Governor of the Bank of England (1993–2003), lung cancer.
Vernon Malone, 77, American politician, member of the North Carolina Senate (2003–2009), natural causes.
Bill Orton, 60, American politician, member of the US House of Representatives from Utah (1991–1997), ATV accident.
Stephanie Parker, 22, British actress (Belonging), apparent suicide by hanging.
Charles Peebler, 72, American advertising executive, progressive supranuclear palsy.
Whitelaw Reid, 95, American journalist, complications of lung and heart failure.
Kiril Vajarov, 21, Bulgarian ice hockey goaltender, member of the national team (2006–2009), stabbed.
Elías Wessin y Wessin, 84, Dominican politician and general, cardiac arrest.

19
Hirmis Aboona, 69, Iraqi historian.
J. G. Ballard, 78, British novelist, prostate cancer.
Doc Blanchard, 84, American college football player (Army), Heisman Trophy winner (1945), pneumonia.
Tilahun Gessesse, 68, Ethiopian singer.
Robert Gillis, 82, American football coach.
Tony Kett, 57, Irish politician, cancer.
Božo Kos, 77, Slovenian illustrator and caricaturist.
Kaimar-ud-Din bin Maidin, 66, Malaysian Olympic athlete.
Tharon Musser, 84, American lighting designer, after long illness.
Dicky Robinson, 82, British footballer (Middlesbrough), after long illness.
Terrell Starr, 82, American politician, member of the Georgia State Senate (1968–2006), heart failure.

20
Beata Asimakopoulou, 77, Greek actress, cancer.
Thomas Hill, 81, American actor.
Qian Lingxi, 92, Chinese physicist and civil engineer, President of Dalian University of Technology.
Franco Rotella, 42, Italian footballer, melanoma.

21
Iqbal Bano, 74, Indian-born Pakistani singer, after short illness.
Paul Ebert, 76, American college baseball and basketball player and surgeon, myocardial infarction.
Robin Gillett, 83, British Lord Mayor of London (1976–1977).
Jack Jones, 96, British trade union leader, veteran of the International Brigades.
H. S. S. Lawrence, 85, Indian educationalist.
Vivian Maier, 83, American street photographer.
James Byron Moran, 78, American jurist (United States District Court for the Northern District of Illinois), after long illness.
Santha Rama Rau, 86, Indian-born American writer, cardiac arrest.

22
Ken Annakin, 94, British film director (The Longest Day, Battle of the Bulge), complications from heart attack and stroke.
Jack Cardiff, 94, British cinematographer (A Matter Of Life And Death, Black Narcissus, The African Queen), natural causes.
Ron Cash, 59, American baseball player.
Marilyn Cooper, 74, American actress, after long illness.
Bill Disney, 77, American Olympic silver medal-winning (1960) speed skater, emphysema.
Bob Hamm, 74, American writer and Cajun humorist, complications related to cancer.
David Kellermann, 41, American businessman, CFO of Freddie Mac since 2008, suicide by hanging.
George C. Rawlings, 87, American politician, member of the Virginia House of Delegates (1964–1969).
Heinz Schröder, 80, German puppeteer.
Colonel Dudley Thornton, 89, British army officer.
Kim Weiskopf, 62, American television writer, pancreatic cancer.

23
William F. Barnes, 91, American football coach (UCLA), complications from pneumonia.
Kenneth Paul Block, 84, American fashion illustrator.
Sir Brian Corby, 79, British businessman, President of the CBI.
Gordon Gair, 92, Canadian lacrosse player.
*Lam Sheung Yee, 74, Hong Kong footballer, coach, announcer and actor.
Ivan Madray, 74, Guyanese cricketer, hypertension.
Felipe Solís Olguín, 64, Mexican archaeologist, curator of the National Anthropology Museum, cardiac arrest.

24
Irving D. Chais, 83, American businessman, owner of the New York Doll Hospital, after long illness.
Tim Curry, 70, American attorney, District Attorney for Tarrant County, Texas, (1972–2009), lung cancer.
Margaret Gelling, 84, British toponymist.
Bo Leuf, 56, Swedish technology writer.
John Michell, 76, British author, cancer.
Sixto Palavecino, 94, Argentine poet and musician.
Michael Parsons, 48, Australian footballer, brain tumour.
Orville Howard Phillips, 85, Canadian politician, member of the Senate of Canada (1963–1999), stroke.
Franciszek Sobczak, 69, Polish Olympic fencer.
Timothy Wright, 61, American pastor and gospel singer, car accident.

25
Bea Arthur, 86, American Emmy and Tony Award-winning actress (Maude, The Golden Girls, Mame), cancer.
Yamil Chade, 88, Lebanese-born Puerto Rican sports team owner and manager.
Hassan Hathout, 84, Egyptian-born American physician and interfaith campaigner.
German Martinez Hidalgo, 79, Mexican scientist.
John Marchi, 87, American politician, member of the New York State Senate (1957–2006), complications from pneumonia.
William Schmidt, 83, American composer.

26
James Addy, 69, Ghanaian athlete.
Salamo Arouch, 86, Greek-born Israeli boxer and Holocaust survivor.
Alan Bristow, 84, British businessman.
Hans Holzer, 89, Austrian-born American paranormal investigator and author, after long illness.
Geir Hovig, 64, Norwegian radio host, after short illness.
Danny Kladis, 92, American racecar driver.
Levan Mikeladze, 52, Georgian diplomat and politician, heart attack.
Dominic Motikoe, Lesotho politician, shot.
Colwyn Philipps, 3rd Viscount St Davids, 70, British aristocrat and politician.
Sir Pupuke Robati, 84, Cook Islands politician and doctor, Prime Minister (1987–1989).
Perez Zagorin, 88, American historian.

27
Ernie Barnes, 70, American neo-mannerist artist and football player, after short illness.
John Crispo, 75, Canadian economist and educator, prostate cancer.
Tom Deitz, 57, American science fiction author, heart failure.
Miroslav Filip, 80, Czech chess player.
Frank Gansz, 70, American football coach (Kansas City Chiefs), complications from knee replacement surgery.
Glen Gondrezick, 53, American basketball player, complications following heart transplant.
Feroz Khan, 69, Indian actor, cancer.
Frankie Manning, 94, American dancer and choreographer, pneumonia.
Edwin McClellan, 83, British Japanologist.
Evgeniya Miroshnichenko, 77, Ukrainian opera and chamber singer.
Karl Mullen, 82, Irish rugby union player.
Greg Page, 50, American boxer, complications from brain injury.
Paraluman, 85, Filipina actress.
Robley Rex, 107, American World War I-era veteran.
*Woo Seung-yeon, 25, South Korean actress and model, suicide by hanging.

28
Bill Bailey, 75, British surfer.
Lota Delgado, 90, Filipina actress.
U. A. Fanthorpe, 79, British poet.
Fritz Gödicke, 89, German football player and manager.
Vern Gosdin, 74, American country music singer, complications from a stroke.
Ekaterina Maximova, 70, Russian ballet dancer.
Steinar Lem, 57, Norwegian environmentalist and anti-consumerism activist, cancer.
Richard Pratt, 74, Australian businessman, prostate cancer.
Valeria Peter Predescu, 62, Romanian singer, heart attack.
Ted Reynolds, 84, Canadian sportscaster (CBC Television).
Buddy Rose, 56, American professional wrestler.
Bruno Scolari, 48, Italian Olympic equestrian.
Pearse Wyse, 81, Irish politician.

29
Günther Bahr, 87, German Luftwaffe fighter pilot.
Jack Lohrke, 85, American baseball player, stroke.
Tom McGrath, 68, British poet and playwright, liver cancer.
William A. Price, 94, American journalist.
Charles L. Young, Sr., 77, American politician, member of the Mississippi House of Representatives, heart attack.

30
Amparo Arozamena, 92, Mexican actress, heart attack.
Maxime de la Falaise, 86, British model, socialite, fashion designer, cookbook writer and gastronome, natural causes.
Harold Fischer, 83, American Air Force officer, Korean War fighter ace and noted PoW, complications from surgery.
Mallory Horne, 84, American politician, member of Florida House of Representatives, President of Florida Senate, lung cancer.
Maurice Lindsay, 90, British poet and broadcaster.
McCoy McLemore, 67, American basketball player and television color analyst, cancer.
Henk Nijdam, 73, Dutch road bicycle racer, track pursuit world champion (1962).
Venetia Phair, 90, British teacher who named Pluto.
David Picão, 85, Brazilian Roman Catholic prelate, bishop of Santos (1996–2000).
Ron Richards, 80, British record producer.
Raymond J. Saulnier, 100, American economist.

References

2009-04
 04